Gustaf Alfons Koutonen (17 August 1910 – 8 July 1977) was a Finnish athlete. He competed in the men's hammer throw at the 1936 Summer Olympics.

References

External links
 

1910 births
1977 deaths
Athletes (track and field) at the 1936 Summer Olympics
Finnish male hammer throwers
Olympic athletes of Finland
Athletes from Helsinki